Ilieşti may refer to several villages in Romania:

 Ilieşti, a village in Întregalde Commune, Alba County
 Ilieşti, a village in Ioneşti Commune, Gorj County

See also 
 Ilie (name)
 Ilieși (disambiguation)